Yumiko Cheng (born 6 September 1981) is a Hong Kong Cantopop singer and actress. Cheng was given the Japanese nickname "Yumiko" by her friends in secondary school, and upon signing with EEG, adopted it as her official stagename.

Career
Cheng was originally marketed as a member of the group 3T (along with Mandy Chiang and Maggie Lau), which released an EP in 2002. She was the sole member of the group who went on to release a solo EP later that year. This was followed by a second EP, DanceDanceDance and her first full-length album One2Three, in 2003.

In 2004, she released the album, Perfect Date, though made a decreasing number of media appearances due to health problems and an overall strategy re-evaluation within her company.

2005 saw a return with the lead single 'Arabian Market', complemented by a novel image that featured her in traditional Arabic dress. She would continue covering Middle-Eastern pop hits in subsequent singles such as 'Lupine Girl' (originally sung by Aneela Mirza) in 2006, and 'Five Centuries' (OT: Bechom Shei In The Heart of Tel Aviv) in 2008, which became a minor hit in its own right in the Chinese dance charts, and was even mentioned in a report by a major Israeli newspaper.

Yumiko's Space, the 2005 album to which 'Arabian Market' belonged, otherwise showed an 80s disco and electronic influence. Veteran music producer Carl Wong took on songwriting and production credits for 6 songs, including that of the second single 'Think'. Electronic pop duo PixelToy also contributed one song, who again appear with songwriting credits on Cheng's 2008 Mandarin album Spectacular Era. Cheng has interviewed in the past that Yumiko's Space remained a personal favourite of all her albums.

Aside from a career in pop music, Cheng has starred in several films, including a special guest appearance in Stanley Kwan's 2005 feature, Everlasting Regret. In August 2015, Cheng left Emperor Entertainment Group after 15 years, and has since focused on acting for mainland television dramas as well as developing her clothing label, "Why So Cool".

Wardrobe malfunction incidents
Cheng dominated the entertainment headlines in December 2006, due to a wardrobe mishap while performing an aerialist stunt for TVB's annual charity show. While being retrieved from mid-air on a trapeze, her trousers were accidentally pulled off by her stunt partner Chin Kar-lok, revealing her underwear. Much to Cheng's embarrassment, the incident garnered a great deal of media attention. The MC Eric Tsang later apologised due to public disapproval over a number of remarks made at the time of the incident, including a request for a replay of the accident in slow motion, though other MCs such as Nancy Sit and Lydia Shum were seen to have laughed uncontrollably in the television broadcast.

She again made news on 23 June 2007 while performing as a featured guest for New Talent Singing Awards Toronto Audition, where she exposed part of her bare chest. The material was cut from the delayed broadcast in Vancouver.

When pressed by Stephen Chen in a 2008 TVB interview to comment on whether or not these incidents were staged, Cheng's manager, Mani Fok remarks: "Every woman has a bottom line."

Personal life 
In June 2012, Yumiko Cheng participated in Cherrie Ying's birthday party in Phuket, Thailand. Because the swimming pool was slippery, a group of actresses and birthday girls suddenly stumbled and fell on the hillside next to the pool. The birthday girl was only slightly injured, but Yumiko Cheng had too much momentum when she fell down the hillside. She was pierced through her lungs by a branch from her back. The condition was serious. People on the scene called an ambulance to send her to the hospital and was sent to the intensive care unit. She was in a coma for two days or two. At night, after a round of rescue, it finally got better.

In August 2012, it was announced that she accepted the proposal of her makeup artist boyfriend Andy for years. The wedding was held on September 5, 2014, the day before her 33rd birthday. It was also revealed on Twins Weibo and Facebook.

On April 8, 2015, she gave birth to her daughter Liang Zirou (baby name: Liang Jiezhu) at the Hong Kong Adventist Hospital, but she was less than 24 hours old. Due to respiratory problems and pulmonary hydrops, she had to be transferred to the Intensive Care Department of Eastern Hospital. The hospital can be discharged after two weeks.

In 2019, Yumiko Cheng daughter "Liang Jiji" celebrated her fourth birthday. Liang Jiji is one of the second generations of popular stars on the Internet. Liang Bianzhu has been dressed stylishly since he was a child, and the two mothers and daughters often pretend to be parent-child.

Discography
'As 3T'
2002: Girl Butterfly 少女蝶

Solo Albums:
26 November 2002: Yumiko The Debut EP 
6 June 2003: Dance Dance Dance (舞舞舞) EP
14 November 2003: One 2 Three 
20 August 2004: Perfect Date 
21 June 2005: Yumiko's Space
13 April 2006: Passion 
10 November 2006: 7 Nutrients (Yumiko New + Best Selection) (七連滋養) 
21 March 2007: Shanghai Doll (上海娃娃)
2 February 2008: Super Model 
20 November 2008: Wonderful Time (精彩年代)
25 September 2014: I'm A Lucky Girl (New + Best Selection)

Filmography

Film

TV series

References

External links
 Yumiko Israel Headline News
 Yumiko Cheng Q&A
 
 Yumiko Cheng's Lyrics, Pinyin, and English Translation

Living people
1981 births
Cantopop singers
Hong Kong Mandopop singers
Hong Kong film actresses
Hong Kong television actresses
Singers from Shanghai
Hong Kong songwriters
21st-century Hong Kong actresses
Actresses from Shanghai
Hong Kong contraltos
Chinese film actresses
Chinese television actresses
21st-century Chinese actresses
21st-century Hong Kong women singers
Hong Kong idols